The County of Bendigo is one of the 37 counties of Victoria which are part of the cadastral divisions of Australia, used for land titles. It includes the city of Bendigo. It is bounded by the Campaspe River in the east, and the Loddon River in the west. The county was proclaimed in 1869.

Parishes 
Parishes within the county:
 Axedale, Victoria (also in Rodney)
 Bagshot, Victoria
 Ballendella, Victoria
 Bamawm, Victoria
 Bridgewater, Victoria
 Calivil, Victoria
 Derby, Victoria
 Diggorra, Victoria
 Dingee, Victoria
 Egerton, Victoria
 Ellesmere, Victoria
 Elmore, Victoria
 Eppalock, Victoria
 Goornong, Victoria
 Hayanmi, Victoria
 Huntly, Victoria
 Janiember East, Victoria
 Janiember West, Victoria
 Jarklan, Victoria
 Kamarooka, Victoria
 Kimbolton, Victoria
 Knowsley, Victoria
 Knowsley East, Victoria
 Laanecoorie, Victoria
 Leichardt, Victoria
 Lockwood, Victoria
 Lyell, Victoria
 Mandurang, Victoria
 Marong, Victoria
 Milloo, Victoria
 Minto, Victoria
 Mitiamo, Victoria
 Neilborough, Victoria
 Nerring, Victoria
 Nolan, Victoria
 Pannoobamawm, Victoria
 Pannoomilloo, Victoria
 Pompapeil, Victoria
 Ravenswood, Victoria (also in Talbot)
 Rochester West, Victoria
 Salisbury, Victoria
 Sandhurst
 Sedgwick, Victoria
 Shelbourne, Victoria
 Strathfieldsaye, Victoria
 Talambe, Victoria
 Tandarra, Victoria
 Wanurp, Victoria
 Warragamba, Victoria
 Wellsford, Victoria
 Whirrakee, Victoria
 Woodstock, Victoria
 Yallook, Victoria
 Yarraberb, Victoria
 Yarryne, Victoria

References
Vicnames, place name details
Research aids, Victoria 1910
 Map of the county of Bendigo showing colony and parish boundaries, main roads, telegraph lines and railways. 1886, J. Sands.

Counties of Victoria (Australia)